Mars Di Bartolomeo (born June 27, 1952 in Dudelange, Luxembourg) is a Luxembourgish politician.

After attending the Esch-sur-Alzette lycée, he worked for the Tageblatt newspaper from 1972 until 1984.

He became parliamentary secretary for the Luxembourg Socialist Workers' Party in 1984. In 1987, Di Bartolomeo became a local councillor, and in 1989 was elected to the Chamber of Deputies. On 1 January 1994, Di Bartolomeo became Mayor of Dudelange. In 2004, he entered the cabinet as Minister of Health and Social Security.

Following the June 2009 legislative elections, Di Bartolomeo kept his posts as Minister of Social Security and Minister of Health, when the Christian Social Party (CSV) and the Luxembourg Socialist Workers’ Party (LSAP) formed a coalition government.

References

External links 
 Official website by gouvernement: Biography Mars Di Bartolomeo (german)

Mayors of Dudelange
Members of the Chamber of Deputies (Luxembourg)
Members of the Chamber of Deputies (Luxembourg) from Sud
Councillors in Dudelange
Luxembourg Socialist Workers' Party politicians
Luxembourgian journalists
Male journalists
Tageblatt people
1952 births
Living people
People from Dudelange